Edward Hill "Bobby" Rothermel (December 18, 1870 – February 11, 1927), was an American infielder in Major League Baseball for one season with the Baltimore Orioles in .

References

External links

1870 births
1927 deaths
Major League Baseball infielders
Baseball players from Pennsylvania
19th-century baseball players
Baltimore Orioles (NL) players
New Orleans Pelicans (baseball) players
St. Joseph Saints players
Syracuse Stars (minor league baseball) players
Rock Island Islanders players
Little Rock Travelers players
Norwich Reds players
People from Berks County, Pennsylvania
Hanover Tigers players